A temple (from the Latin ) is a building reserved for spiritual rituals and activities such as prayer and sacrifice.  Religions which erect temples include Christianity (whose temples are typically called churches), Hinduism, Buddhism, Sikhism (whose temples are called gurudwara), Jainism (whose temples are sometimes called derasar), Islam (whose temples are called mosques), Judaism (whose temples are called synagogues), Zoroastrianism (whose temples are sometimes called Agiary), the Baha'i Faith (which are often simply referred to as Baha'i House of Worship), Taoism (which are sometimes called Daoguan), Shinto (which are sometimes called Jinja), Confucianism (which are sometimes called the Temple of Confucius), and ancient religions such as the Ancient Egyptian religion and the Ancient Greek religion.

The form and function of temples are thus very variable, though they are often considered by believers to be, in some sense, the "house" of one or more deities.  Typically, offerings of some sort are made to the deity, and other rituals are enacted, and a special group of clergy maintain and operate the temple.  The degree to which the whole population of believers can access the building varies significantly; often parts, or even the whole main building. can only be accessed by the clergy.  Temples typically have a main building and a larger precinct, which may contain many other buildings or may be a dome-shaped structure, much like an igloo.

The word comes from Ancient Rome, where a  constituted a sacred precinct as defined by a priest, or augur. It has the same root as the word "template," a plan in preparation for the building that was marked out on the ground by the augur.

Hindu temples

Hindu temples are known by many different names, varying on region and language, including Alayam, Mandir, Mandira, Ambalam, Gudi, Kavu, Koil, Kovil, Déul, Raul, Devasthana, Devalaya, Devayatan, Devakula, Devagiriha, Degul, Deva Mandiraya, and Devalaya. Hindu temple architecture is mainly divided into the Dravidian style of the south and the Nagara style of the north, with other regional styles.

The basic elements of the Hindu temple remain the same across all periods and styles. The most essential feature is the inner sanctuary, the garbhagriha or womb-chamber, where the primary murti or cult image of a deity is housed in a simple bare cell. Around this chamber there are often other structures and buildings, in the largest cases covering several acres. On the exterior, the garbhagriha is crowned by a tower-like shikhara, also called the vimana in the south. The shrine building may include an ambulatory for parikrama (circumambulation), one or more mandapas or congregation halls, and sometimes an antarala antechamber and porch between garbhagriha and mandapa.

A Hindu temple is a symbolic house, the seat and dwelling of Hindu gods. It is a structure designed to bring human beings and gods together according to Hindu faith. Inside its garbhagriha innermost sanctum, a Hindu temple contains a murti or Hindu god's image. Hindu temples are large and magnificent with a rich history. There is evidence of use of sacred ground as far back as the Bronze Age and later during the Indus Valley civilization.

Outside of the Indian subcontinent (India, Bangladesh and Nepal), Hindu temples have been built in various countries around the world. Either following the historic diffusion of Hinduism across Asia (e.g. ancient stone temples of Cambodia and Indonesia), or following the migration of the Indian Hindus' diaspora; to Western Europe (esp. Great Britain), North America (the United States and Canada), as well as Australia, Malaysia and Singapore, Mauritius and South Africa.

Buddhist temples

Buddhist temples include the structures called stupa, wat and pagoda in different regions and languages. A Buddhist temple might contain a meditation hall hosting Buddharupa, or the image of Buddha, as the object of concentration and veneration during a meditation. The stupa domed structures are also used in a circumambulation ritual called Pradakshina.

Temples in Buddhism represent the pure land or pure environment of a Buddha. Traditional Buddhist temples are designed to inspire inner and outer peace.

Three types of structures are associated with the religious architecture of early Buddhism: monasteries (viharas), places to venerate relics (stupas), and shrines or prayer halls (chaityas, also called chaitya grihas), which later came to be called temples in some places. The pagoda is an evolution of the Indian stupas.

The initial function of a stupa was the veneration and safe-guarding of the relics of Gautama Buddha. The earliest archaeologically known example of a stupa is the relic stupa located in Vaishali, Bihar in India.

In accordance with changes in religious practice, stupas were gradually incorporated into chaitya-grihas (prayer halls). These are exemplified by the complexes of the Ajanta Caves and the Ellora Caves (Maharashtra). The Mahabodhi Temple at Bodh Gaya in Bihar is another well-known example.

As Buddhism spread, Buddhist architecture diverged in style, reflecting the similar trends in Buddhist art. Building form was also influenced to some extent by the different forms of Buddhism in the northern countries, practising Mahayana Buddhism in the main and in the south where Theravada Buddhism prevailed.

Jain temples

A Jain temple, called a Derasar, is the place of worship for Jains, the followers of Jainism. Some famous Jain temples are Shikharji, Palitana temples, Ranakpur Jain temple, Shravan Belgola, Dilwara Temples and Lal Mandir. Jain temples are built with various architectural designs. Jain temples in North India are completely different from the Jain temples in South India, which in turn are quite different from Jain temples in West India. Additionally, a manastambha (literally 'column of honor') is a pillar that is often constructed in front of Jain temples.

Sikh temples

A Sikh temple is called a gurdwara, literally the doorway to the Guru. Its most essential element is the presence of the Guru, Guru Granth Sahib. The gurdwara has an entrance from all sides, signifying that they are open to all without any distinction whatsoever. The gurdwara has a Darbar Sahib where the Guru Granth Sahib is seen and a Langar where people can eat free food. A gurdwara may also have a library, nursery, and classroom.

Mesopotamian temples

The temple-building tradition of Mesopotamia derived from the cults of gods and deities in the Mesopotamian religion. It spanned several civilizations; from Sumerian, Akkadian, Assyrian, and Babylonian. The most common temple architecture of Mesopotamia is the structure of sun-baked bricks called a ziggurat, having the form of a terraced step pyramid with a flat upper terrace where the shrine or temple stood.

Egyptian temples

Ancient Egyptian temples were meant as places for the deities to reside on earth. Indeed, the term the Egyptians most commonly used to describe the temple building, means 'mansion (or enclosure) of a god'.

A god's presence in the temple linked the human and divine realms and allowed humans to interact with the god through ritual. These rituals, it was believed, sustained the god and allowed it to continue to play its proper role in nature. They were, therefore, a key part of the maintenance of maat, the ideal order of nature and of human society in Egyptian belief. Maintaining  was the entire purpose of Egyptian religion, and thus it was the purpose of a temple as well.

Ancient Egyptian temples were also of economic significance to Egyptian society. The temples stored and redistributed grain and came to own large portions of the nation's arable land (some estimate as much as 33% by the New Kingdom period). In addition, many of these Egyptian temples utilized the Tripartite Floor Plan in order to draw visitors to the center room.

Greco-Roman temples

Greek and Roman temples were originally built out of wood and mud bricks, but as the empires expanded, the temples grew to monumental size, made out of materials such as stone and marble on raised platforms. While the color has long since faded, The columns would have been painted in white, blue, red, and black. Above the columns would have been a sculpted or painted depiction of a myth or battle, with freestanding sculptures in the pediment triangles. The roofs were tiled and had sculptures of mythical animals or deities on the tops or corners. Greek temples also had several standard floor plans with very distinct column placement.

Located in the front of the temple were alters intended for sacrifices or offerings. Ouranic alters were usually square, lined with a metal pan for burnt offerings, and a flat top which was necessary for the ouranic gods to receive offerings. Chthonic alters, called bothros, were pits dug into the earth for liquid libations of animal sacrifices, milk, honey, and wine. The building which housed the cult statue or agalma in its cella was located in the center of the temple in Greek architecture, while in Rome, the cella was in the back. Greek temple architecture had a profound influence on ancient architectural traditions.

Greco-Roman temples were built facing eastward, utilizing the rising sun in morning rituals. The location each temple was built also depended on many factors such as environment, myth, function, and divine experience. Most were built on sites associated with myths or a place a god had been believed to have performed a feat, or founded a town or city. Many Roman temples had close associations with important events in Roman history, such as military victories. Temples in cities were often dedicated to the founding deity of the city, but also served as civic and social centers. The Temple of Saturn even held the state treasury and treasury offices in its basement.

Pagan temples

Medieval Latin writers also sometimes used the word , previously reserved for temples of the ancient Roman religion. In some cases it is hard to determine whether a temple was a building or an outdoor shrine. For temple buildings of the Vikings, the Old Norse term hof is often used.

Zoroastrian temples

A Zoroastrian temple may also be called a Dar-e-mehr and an Atashkadeh. A fire temple in Zoroastrianism is the place of worship for Zoroastrians. Zoroastrians revere fire in any form, and their temples contains an eternal flame, with Atash Behram (Fire of Victory) as the highest grade of all, as it combines 16 different types of fire gathered in elaborate rituals.

In the Zoroastrian religion, fire (Atar), together with clean water (Aban), are agents of ritual purity. Clean, white "ash for the purification ceremonies is regarded as the basis of ritual life," which, "are essentially the rites proper to the tending of a domestic fire, for the temple fire is that of the hearth fire raised to a new solemnity".

Chinese temples

Chinese temples refer to temples in accordance with Chinese culture, which serve as a house of worship for Chinese faiths, namely Confucianism, Taoism, Buddhism and Chinese folk religion. Chinese temples were born from the age-old religion and tradition of Chinese people since the ancient era of imperial China, thus they are usually built in typical classical Chinese architecture.

Other than the base constructed from an elevated platform of earth and stones, most parts of Chinese temples are made of timber carpentry, with parts of brick masonry and glazed ceramics for roofs and tile decorations. Typical Chinese temples have curved overhanging eaves and complicated carpentry of stacked roof construction. Chinese temples are known for their vivid colour and rich decorations. Their roofs are often decorated with mythical beasts, such as Chinese dragons and qilins, and sometimes also Chinese deities. Chinese temples can be found throughout Mainland China and Taiwan, and also where Chinese expatriate communities have settled abroad; thus Chinese temples can be found in Chinatowns worldwide.

Indonesian temples

Candi is an Indonesian term to refer to ancient temples. Before the rise of Islam, between the 5th to 15th centuries, Dharmic faiths (Hinduism and Buddhism) were the majority in the Indonesian archipelago, especially in Java and Sumatra. The  architecture follows the typical Indonesian architectural traditions based on Vastu Shastra. The temple layout, especially in the Central Java period, incorporated mandala temple plan arrangements and also the typical high towering spires of Hindu temples. The  was designed to mimic Meru, the holy mountain and the abode of the gods. In contemporary Indonesian Buddhist perspective,  refers to a shrine, either ancient or new. Several contemporary viharas in Indonesia, for example, contain an actual-size replica or reconstruction of famous Buddhist temples, such as the replica of Pawon and Plaosan's  (small) temples.

According to local beliefs, the Java valley had thousands of Hindu temples that co-existed with Buddhist temples, most of which were buried in the massive eruption of Mount Merapi in 1006 AD.

Mesoamerican temples

Temples of the Mesoamerican civilization usually took the shape of stepped pyramids with temples or shrines on top of the massive structure. They are more akin to the ziggurats of Mesopotamia than to Egyptian ones. A single or several flight(s) of steep steps from the base lead to the temple that stood on the plateau on top of the pyramid. The stone temple might be a square or a rounded structure with a door opening leading to a cella or inner sanctum. The plateau on top of the pyramid in front of the temple is where the ritualistic sacrifice took place.

Some classic Mesoamerican pyramids are adorned with stories about the feathered serpent Quetzalcoatl or Mesoamerican creation myths, written in the form of hieroglyphs on the rises of the steps of the pyramids, on the walls, and on the sculptures contained within. Notable example include Aztec Acatitlan and Mayan Chichen Itza, Uxmal and Tikal.

Jewish synagogues and temples

In Judaism, the ancient Hebrew texts refer not to temples, the word having not existed yet, but to a "sanctuary", "palace" or "hall". Each of the two ancient temples in Jerusalem was called in the Tanakh , which translates literally as 'YHWH's House'.

The Temple Mount in Jerusalem is the site where the First Temple of Solomon and the Second Temple were built. At the center of the structure was the Holy of Holies where only the High Priest could enter. The Temple Mount is now the site of the Islamic edifice, the Dome of the Rock (c. 690).

The Greek word synagogue came into use to describe Jewish (and Samaritan) places of worship during Hellenistic times and it, along with the Yiddish term shul, and the original Hebrew term Beit Knesset ('House of meeting') are the terms in most universal usage.

Since the 18th Century, Jews in Western and Central Europe began to apply the name temple, borrowed from the French where it was used to denote all non-Catholic prayer houses, to synagogues. The term became strongly associated with Reform institutions, in some of which both congregants and outsiders associated it with the elimination of the prayers for the restoration of the Jerusalem Temple, though this was not the original meaning—traditional synagogues named themselves "temple" over a century before the advent of Reform, and many continued to do so after. In American parlance, temple is often synonymous with synagogue, but especially non-Orthodox ones.

The term kenesa, from the Aramaic for 'assembly', is used to describe the places of worship of Karaite Jews.

Example of such temple is the Sofia Synagogue, Bulgaria the largest synagogue in Southeastern Europe and third-largest in Europe.

Christian temples

Orthodox Christianity

The word temple is used frequently in the tradition of Eastern Christianity; particularly the Eastern Orthodox Church, where the principal words used for houses of worship are temple and church. The use of the word temple comes from the need to distinguish a building of the church vs. the church seen as the Body of Christ. In the Russian language (similar to other Slavic languages), while the general-purpose word for 'church' is tserkov, the term , 'temple', is used to refer to the church building as a temple of God. The words church and temple, in this case are interchangeable; however, the term church is far more common. The term temple is also commonly applied to larger churches. Some famous churches which are referred to as temples include the Hagia Sophia, Saint Basil's Cathedral, Alexander Nevsky Cathedral, Sofia, the Cathedral of Christ the Saviour and the Temple of Saint Sava in Belgrade, Serbia.

Catholicism

The word temple has traditionally been rarely used in the English-speaking Western Christian tradition. In Irish, some pre-schism churches use the word teampall. The usual word for church in the Hungarian language is templom, also deriving from the same Latin root. Spanish distinguishes between the temple being the physical building for religious activity, and the church being both the physical building for religious activity and also the congregation of religious followers.

The principal words typically used to distinguish houses of worship in Western Christian architecture are abbey, basilica, cathedral, chapel and church. The Catholic Church has used the word temple in reference of a place of worship on rare occasions. An example is the Roman Catholic Sagrada Familia Temple in Barcelona, Spain and the Roman Catholic Basilique du Sacré-Cœur Temple in Paris, France. Another example is the Temple or Our Lady of the Pillar, a church in Guadalajara, Mexico.

Protestantism

Also, some Protestant churches use this term; above main entrance of the Lutheran Gustav Vasa church in Stockholm, Sweden is a cartouche in Latin which reads "this temple (...) was constructed by king Oscar II."

Beginning in the late eighteenth century, following the Enlightenment, some Protestant denominations in France and elsewhere began to use the word temple to distinguish these spaces from Catholic churches. Evangelical and other Protestant churches make use of a wide variety of terms to designate their worship spaces, such as church, tabernacle or temple. Additionally some breakaway Catholic churches such as the Mariavite Church in Poland have chosen to also designate their central church building as a temple, as in the case of the Temple of Mercy and Charity in Płock.

Latter Day Saint movement

According to Latter Day Saints, in 1832, Joseph Smith received a revelation to restore the practice of temple worship, in a "house of the Lord". The Kirtland Temple was the first temple of the Latter-day Saint movement and the only one completed in Smith's lifetime, although the Nauvoo Temple was partially complete at the time of his death. The schisms stemming from a succession crisis have led to differing views about the role and use of temples between various groups with competing succession claims.

The Book of Mormon, which Latter Day Saints believe is a companion book of scripture with the Bible, refers to temple building in the ancient Americas by a group of people called the Nephites. Though Book of Mormon authors are not explicit about the practices in these Nephite temples, they were patterned "after the manner of the temple of Solomon" and served as gathering places for significant religious and political events (e.g. Mosiah 1–6; 3rd Nephi 11–26).

The Church of Jesus Christ of Latter-day Saints

The Church of Jesus Christ of Latter-day Saints is a prolific builder of temples.  Latter-day Saint temples are reserved for performing and undertaking only the most holy and sacred of covenants and special of ordinances. They are distinct from meeting houses and chapels where weekly worship services are held. The temples are built and kept under strict sacredness and are not to be defiled.  Thus, strict rules apply for entrance, including church membership and regular attendance. During the open-house period after its construction and before its dedication, the temple is open to the public for tours.

Other Latter Day Saint denominations
Various sects in the Latter Day Saint movement founded by Joseph Smith have temples.
The Church of Christ (Wightite), a Latter Day Saint denomination formed by Lyman Wight following the death of Joseph Smith, built first Mormon temple west of the Mississippi in Zodiac, Texas. about three miles from Fredericksburg. 
 In 1990 or earlier a temple in Ozumba, Mexico was built by the Apostolic United Brethren.
On April 17, 1994, the Independence Temple in Independence, Missouri, was open by the Community of Christ by then-church Prophet-President Wallace B. Smith. The Community of Christ also currently owns the original Kirtland Temple, dedicated in 1836 by the Church of the Latter Day Saints (later renamed the Church of Jesus Christ of Latter Day Saints), in Kirtland, Ohio.  The Community of Christ operates the Kirtland Temple as a historic site.
In 2005 construction on the  YFZ Ranch Temple by the Fundamentalist Church of Jesus Christ of Latter-Day Saints Church began.  It is located just outside Eldorado in Schleicher County, Texas.  However, as of April 2014, the State of Texas took physical and legal possession of the property. as it was used to "commit or facilitate certain criminal conduct."
 A pyramid-shaped temple near Modena, Utah, was built by the Righteous Branch of the Church of Jesus Christ of Latter-day Saints.

Esoteric Christianity

Mount Ecclesia Esoteric Christian Temple of the Rosicrucian Fellowship with its round 12-sided building architecture set on top of a mesa and facing east, the rising Sun. This modern-day temple is ornamented with alchemical and astrological symbols.

Masonic temples

Freemasonry is a fraternal organization with its origins in the eighteenth century whose membership is held together by a shared set of moral and metaphysical ideals based on short role play narratives concerning the construction of King Solomon's Temple. Freemasons meet as a Lodge. Lodges meet in a Masonic Temple (in reference to King Solomon's Temple), Masonic Center or a Masonic Hall, such as Freemasons' Hall, London. Some confusion exists as Masons usually refer to a Lodge meeting as being in Lodge.

Others

Göbekli Tepe, located in southern Turkey, was built between the 8th and 10th millennium BCE. Its circular compounds on top of a tell are composed by massive T-shaped stone pillars decorated with abstract, enigmatic pictograms and animal reliefs. 
Temples of Sheikh, ancient temples in Sheikh, Somalia
Temple of Yeha, the oldest standing structure in Yeha, Ethiopia; built around 700 BCE
In the Star Wars films, the Jedi Temple is located on Coruscant.
Wolmyeongdong Natural Temple, located in South Korea, was developed beginning in 1990 and continues to this day.
Pashupatinath is one of the most famous temples of Hindu religion, which is located at Kathmandu, Nepal.

Convention sometimes allows the use of temple in some of the following cases:

Baháʼí Faith temple (Mashriqu'l-Adhkárs or ‘Houses of Worship’).
Mankhim, the temple of the ethnic group the Rai, located at Aritar, Sikkim.
Confucian temple or Temple of Confucius.
Shintoist jinja are normally called shrines in English in order to distinguish them from Buddhist temples (-tera, -dera).
Shrines of the traditional Chinese Ethnic Shenism are called miao, or ancestral hall in English. Joss house is an obsolete American term for such kind of places of worship.

See also
Chinese pagoda
Dravidian architecture
List of temples of Tamil Nadu
Mandi (Mandaeism)
Mosque
National Temple of Divine Providence
Place of worship
Chinese temple
Candi of Indonesia
Balinese temple
Jangam

References

Further reading
Hani, Jean, Le symbolisme du temple chrétien, G. Trédaniel (editor); [2. éd.] edition (1978), 207 p.,

External links

 Definition of 'temple' at the Online Etymology Dictionary
 Comparison between Egyptian and Greek temples

 
Building types
Types of monuments and memorials
Sacral architecture
Religious buildings and structures